The Hungarian name Szentgyörgy can refer to:
Svätý Jur (Pozsonyszentgyörgy) in Slovakia
Sfântu Gheorghe (Sepsiszentgyörgy) in Romania
Szentgyörgymező, Esztergom, Hungary